A referendum was held in San Marino on 26 October 1997. Voters were asked whether they approved of a proposal that any corporation buying, administering or selling land and property would have to be a public company. It was approved by 88.1% of voters.

Results

References

1997 referendums
1997
1997 in San Marino
October 1997 events in Europe